Talda (Taldu) is a rural locality (a selo) in Ongudaysky District, the Altai Republic, Russia. The population was 98 as of 2016. There is 1 street.

Geography 
Talda is located 32 km northwest of Onguday (the district's administrative centre) by road. Shiba is the nearest rural locality.

References 

Rural localities in Ongudaysky District